Colin Crampton (born 19 April 1933) is a former  Australian rules footballer who played with North Melbourne in the Victorian Football League (VFL).

Crampton was captain / coach of the Moyhu Football Club in 1968.

Notes

External links 

Living people
1933 births
Australian rules footballers from Victoria (Australia)
North Melbourne Football Club players
Rutherglen Football Club players